Jakub Kaszuba (born 28 January 1988 in Poland) is a retired Polish footballer who played as a forward.

Early life

Born in 1988, Kaszuba grew up idolizing Sweden international Zlatan Ibrahimović. As a youth player, Kaszuba joined the youth academy of Bałtyk Gdynia. He was nicknamed "Kasza" and was regarded as one of the brightest youth prospects in Poland.

Career

Kaszuba started his career with Bałtyk Gdynia. In total, he scored 27 league goals for them during his first stint there. After that, he signed for Cracovia. He played for the first team while simultaneously playing for their youth team. Kaszubed finished as top scorer of the 2009/10 Youth Ekstraklasa with 13 goals. He also featured in friendlies for the first team. 

In total, he made 22 league appearances for Cracovia and scored 2 goals.
He scored his first league goal for Cracovia during a 1-1 draw with Polonia Warsaw, dedicating the goal to his parents, the only goal he scored for the first team during the 2008/09 season.

In 2008/09, he suffered an injury. He returned to play May 2009 after receiving treatment. He scored his second league goal for Cracovia during a 2-6 loss to Lechia Gdańsk, the only goal he scored for the first team during the 2009/10 season.

In the summer 2010, he returned to Bałtyk Gdynia. He made 21 league appearances and scored 2 goals during his second stint there. After that, he signed for Kaszubia Kościerzyna. He made 20 league appearances and scored 3 goals there. In 2013, he signed for Gryf Wejherowo. He made 13 league appearances and scored 2 goals there. After that, he stopped playing professional football for a year.

Style of play

Kaszuba was known for his height and physicality as a striker.

References

External links 
 Player stats at 90minut.pl

1988 births
Living people
Sportspeople from Gdynia
Polish footballers
MKS Cracovia (football) players
Bałtyk Gdynia players
Gryf Wejherowo players
Association football forwards
21st-century Polish people